Anthony Steven Kinsella (born 30 October 1961) is an English former footballer who played as a left winger in the Football League.

PLaying career
Born in Orsett in Essex, Kinsella started his career in the youth team at Millwall, winning an FA Youth Cup winners medal in 1979. He played for a number of professional football teams in England and the USA.

Coaching career
Kinsella joined the coaching staff at Leiston in 2015. After manager Glen Driver left the club in October 2018, Kinsella took over for a match as caretaker manager, before also leaving.

In 2019, Kinsella became Driver's assistant at Braintree Town.

References

1961 births
Living people
English footballers
People from Orsett
Association football midfielders
Ipswich Town F.C. players
Tampa Bay Rowdies (1975–1993) players
Enfield F.C. players
Doncaster Rovers F.C. players
Millwall F.C. players
Chelmsford City F.C. players
English Football League players
North American Soccer League (1968–1984) players
English expatriate sportspeople in the United States
Expatriate soccer players in the United States
English expatriate footballers